Sidi-Ayad is a small town in northern Algeria, 3 kilometers from the Soummam River in Béjaïa Province in the Kabylie region. It is made up of four villages (Hamam, Thakhlichth, Azrou and Maala) and is known for its resistance, with the rest of the region, in the War of Independence. It is a poor town due to lack of government investment and much of the population's income comes from immigrants in Europe and other cities. Local agriculture involves mainly olive trees.

Communes of Béjaïa Province
Cities in Algeria
Algeria